Hoseynkhan or Hoseyn Khan may refer to:

 Hoseyn Khan, Kurdistan
 Hoseyn Aliabad, Lorestan
 Hoseynkhan, Lorestan
 Hoseynkhan, alternate name of Chenaran, Lorestan